Adelino Anderson Pestana (born 1 March 1992) is an Angolan handball player for Interclube and the Angolan national team.

He participated at the 2017 World Men's Handball Championship.

References

1992 births
Living people
Angolan male handball players
African Games silver medalists for Angola
African Games medalists in handball
Competitors at the 2011 All-Africa Games
Competitors at the 2015 African Games
Competitors at the 2019 African Games